Concrete Block House may refer to:

Concrete Block House (614 N. 4th Ave., Phoenix, Arizona), listed on the National Register of Historic Places in Maricopa County, Arizona
Concrete Block House (618 N. 4th Ave., Phoenix, Arizona), listed on the National Register of Historic Places in Maricopa County, Arizona
Concrete Block House (640 N. 6th Ave., Phoenix, Arizona), listed on the National Register of Historic Places in Maricopa County, Arizona

See also
Goodfellow-Julian Concrete Block District, St. Louis, Missouri, National Register of Historic Places listings in St. Louis, Missouri
Oakherst Place Concrete Block District, St. Louis, Missouri, National Register of Historic Places listings in St. Louis, Missouri